Azygophleps sheikh is a moth in the family Cossidae found in Saudi Arabia and Yemen.

References

Moths described in 2011
Azygophleps
Moths of the Middle East